The 1914–15 Scottish Division Two was the last season of play in the Scottish Division Two before World War I. It would not commence again until the  1921–22 season.

It was won by Cowdenbeath after a round robin tournament to decide the title with three clubs tied.  Vale of Leven finished bottom.

Table

Championship play-off

Source:

References 

 Scottish Football Archive

Scottish Division Two seasons
2